Crowheart is a census-designated place (CDP) in Fremont County, Wyoming, United States. The population was 141 at the 2010 census.  Nearby Crowheart Butte was the site of a battle between the Crow and Shoshone American Indian tribes in 1866.  According to legend, following a five-day battle for rights to the hunting grounds in the Wind River Range, Chief Washakie of the Shoshone and Chief Big Robber of the Crow agreed to a duel, with the winner gaining the rights to the Wind River hunting grounds.  Chief Washakie eventually prevailed, but he was so impressed with the courage of his opponent, that rather than scalp him, he instead cut out his heart and placed it on the end of his lance.

Demographics
As of the census of 2000, there were 163 people, 62 households, and 43 families residing in the CDP. The population density was 5.2 people per square mile (2.0/km2). There were 80 housing units at an average density of 2.6/sq mi (1.0/km2). The racial makeup of the CDP was 49.08% White, 43.56% Native American, 1.23% from other races, and 6.13% from two or more races. 3.07% of the population were Hispanic or Latino of any race.

There were 62 households, out of which 37.1% had children under the age of 18 living with them, 45.2% were married couples living together; 16.1% had a female householder with no husband present, and 30.6% were non-families. 27.4% of all households were made up of individuals, and 8.1% had someone living alone who was 65 years of age or older. The average household size was 2.63 and the average family size was 3.23.

In the CDP, the population was spread out, with 32.5% under the age of 18, 6.7% from 18 to 24, 23.9% from 25 to 44, 27.0% from 45 to 64, and 9.8% who were 65 years of age or older. The median age was 36 years. For every 100 females, there were 147.0 males. For every 100 females age 18 and over, there were 120.0 males.

The median income for a household in the CDP was $35,500, and the median income for a family was $35,750. Males had a median income of $31,111 versus $30,313 for females. The per capita income for the CDP was $18,434. 14.0% of the population and 17.8% of families were below the poverty line. Out of the total population, 8.2% of those under the age of 18 and 52.2% of those 65 and older were living below the poverty line.

Education

Public education in the community of Crowheart is provided by Fremont County School District #6. Zoned campuses include Crowheart Elementary School (grades K-3) and Wind River Middle/High School (grades 6-12).

Notable people from Crowheart 
 Matthew Fox — Plays Jack Shephard in Lost and was also a main character in Party of Five.

References 

Census-designated places in Fremont County, Wyoming
Census-designated places in Wyoming